Élie Chouraqui (born 3 July 1950) is a French film director and scriptwriter. His 1996 film Les menteurs was entered into the 46th Berlin International Film Festival.

He made several films with Anouk Aimée.

In his younger days he was a volleyball enthusiast and was captain of the French Volleyball team at the European and World championships winning 112 caps. He commentated on volleyball from French Television at the 2016 Rio Olympics.

Filmography
1978: Mon premier amour
1980: Une page d'amour
1982: Qu'est-ce qui fait courir David?
1985: Paroles et Musique
1987: Man on Fire
1990: Miss Missouri
1993: Les marmottes
1996: Les menteurs
2000: Harrison's Flowers
2006: O Jerusalem
2009: Celle que j'aime
2016: The Origin of Violence

Musical theatre
2000: Les Dix Commandements
2004: Spartacus le Gladiateur
2010: Fallait pas me mentir

References

External links

1950 births
Living people
French screenwriters
French film producers
Musical theatre directors
Film directors from Paris